The Tierberg is a mountain in the Swabian Jura in the German state of Baden-Württemberg. It is located in Zollernalbkreis.

Mountains and hills of the Swabian Jura
Zollernalbkreis